The pencil bomb attacks were used in multiple acts of state-sponsored terrorism by Imperial Germany during World War I. The pencil bombs were a type of time bomb with a timer that could be set to detonate at any given time.  It was designed by German chemist Dr.  and used by German field agent Captain Franz von Rintelen of the  intelligence wing of the German Imperial Navy during World War I.

Design
When the bomb prototype was first shown to Rintelen by Scheele it was a hollow cylinder of lead the size of a large cigar. Into the middle of the tube a circular disc of copper had been pressed and soldered, dividing it into two chambers. One of these chambers was filled with picric acid, the other with sulphuric acid or some other nonflammable liquid. A strong plug made of wax with a simple lead cap made both ends airtight. The copper disc could be as thick or as thin as desired. If it were thick, the two acids on either side took a long time to eat their way through. If it were thin, the mingling of the two acids would occur within a few days. By regulating the thickness of the disc it was possible to determine the time when the acids should come together. This formed a safe and efficient time-fuse. When the two acids mingled at the appointed time, a silent but intense flame, from twenty to thirty centimetres long, shot out from both ends of the tube, and while it was still burning the lead casing melted away, leaving very little evidence of the source of the fire.

Use
Von Rintelen and his ring of German agents would slip the bombs onto ships carrying munitions bound for war. The incendiary device ignited cargos when ships were far at sea. It was estimated later that he alone had destroyed $10 million (USD $ million in ) worth of cargo on 36 ships.

Manufacture
The first batch of bombs was manufactured on the SS Friedrich Der Grosse, a Norddeutscher Lloyd liner that at the outset of World War I was interned by the United States in New York harbour.  German sailors from the ship helped in manufacture.  The SS Phoebus was chosen as a test case and as was reported in the Shipping News, "Accidents. S.S. Phoebus from New York—destination Archangel—caught fire at sea. Brought into port of Liverpool by H.M.S. Ajax."

See also
Improvised explosive device
Pencil detonator

Bibliography 
Notes

References 

 - Total pages: 271

Bombs
Espionage scandals and incidents
Improvised explosive devices
Terrorist incidents in the 1910s
World War I crimes by Imperial Germany
World War I spies for Germany